The 2010 Schmirler Curling Classic presented by Bank of America was held Sept. 24–27 at the Callie Curling Club in Regina, Saskatchewan. It was held on the second weekend of the Women's World Curling Tour of the 2010–11 curling season. The total purse of the event was $47,000 with $12,000 going to the winning team. Amber Holland went on to defeat Saskatchewan native Sherry Middaugh in the final.

Teams
 Brett Barber
 Erika Brown
 Heather Burnett
 Chelsea Carey
 Marie Christianson
 Chantelle Eberle
 Michelle Englot
 Lisa Eyamie
 Kerri Flett
 Janet Harvey
 Amber Holland
 Susan Lang
 Patti Lank
 Stefanie Lawton
 Brooklyn Lemon
 Sherry Middaugh
 Heather Nedohin
 Kathy O'Rourke
 Sherrilee Orstead
 Cathy Overton-Clapham
 Trish Paulsen
 Liudmila Privivkova
 Cindy Ricci
 Holly Scott
 Mandy Selzer
 Anna Sidorova
 Robyn Silvernagle
 Jill Thurston
 Wang Bingyu
 Crystal Webster

Draw

Tie breaker: Carey 7-1 Flett

Playoffs

External links
WCT event site

Schmirler Curling Classic, 2010
Schmirler Curling
Curling in Saskatchewan